The 7th Alpini Regiment is a regiment of the Italian Army's mountain infantry speciality, the Alpini, which distinguished itself in combat during World War I and World War II.

History

Formation 
The 7th Alpini Regiment was formed on 1 August 1887 by splitting the 6th Alpini Regiment: the regimental command of the 6th together with the Alpini battalions Feltre, Gemona, and Pieve di Cadore formed the 7th Alpini Regiment in Conegliano. On 9 May 1908 the regiment raised the Alpini Battalion "Tolmezzo", which was ceded a year later together with the Gemona to form the 8th Alpini Regiment. To bring the regiment back to full strength the regiment raised the Belluno battalion on 1 October 1910 and. The same year the regimental command moved to the city of Belluno.

As with all Alpini regiments the regiment's battalions were named for the location of their depot around which they recruited their troops. At the end of 1910 the regiment was structured as follows:

 7th Alpini Regiment, in Belluno
  Alpini Battalion "Feltre", in Feltre
  64th Alpini Company
  65th Alpini Company
  66th Alpini Company
  Alpini Battalion "Pieve di Cadore", in Pieve di Cadore
  67th Alpini Company
  68th Alpini Company
  75th Alpini Company
  Alpini Battalion "Belluno", in Belluno
  77th Alpini Company
  78th Alpini Company
  79th Alpini Company

Italo-Turkish War 
In October 1912 the Feltre was dispatched to Tripolitania to fight against the Ottoman Empire in the Italo-Turkish War. There the battalion earned the regiment its first Silver Medal of Military Valour for the battalion's conduct during the Battle of Assaba. In August 1914 the battalion returned to Italy.

World War I 

After the outbreak of World War I the regiment raised a fourth company for each of its battalions: 95th Alpini Company for the Feltre, 96th Alpini Company for the Pieve di Cadore, and 106th Alpini Company for the Belluno. With tensions between the Kingdom of Italy and the Austro-Hungarian Empire growing the regiment activated its first line reserve units between 5 and 30 January 1915:

  Alpini Battalion "Val Cismon", in Feltre (Feltre reservists)
  264th Alpini Company
  265th Alpini Company
  Alpini Battalion "Val Piave", in Pieve di Cadore (Pieve di Cadore reservists)
  267th Alpini Company
  268th Alpini Company
  Alpini Battalion "Val Cordevole", in Belluno (Belluno reservists)
  206th Alpini Company
  266th Alpini Company

After the Italian declaration of war against Austria-Hungary the regiment's battalions were immediately employed on the frontline, which ran through the Alps:

 Feltre and Val Cismon, in the Brenta - Cismon Sector
 Belluno and Val Cordevole, in the Cordevole Sector (including Passo Fedaia)
 Pieve di Cadore and Val Piave, in the Ansiei - Padola Sector (including Monte Piana)

At the end of November 1915, the three reserve battalion received each a third company: 275th Alpini Company for the Val Piave, 276th Alpini Company for the Val Cordevole, and 277th Alpini Company for the Val Cismon. In December the training of the reservists of the third line battalions began, which also received the fourth company originally raised for the first line battalions:

  Alpini Battalion "Monte Pavione", in Feltre (Feltre reservists)
  95th Alpini Company (former fourth company of the Feltre)
  148th Alpini Company
  149th Alpini Company
  Alpini Battalion "Monte Antelao", in Pieve di Cadore (Pieve di Cadore reservists)
  96th Alpini Company (former fourth company of the Pieve di Cadore)
  150th Alpini Company
  151st Alpini Company
  Alpini Battalion "Monte Pelmo", in Belluno (Belluno reservists)
  106th Alpini Company (former fourth company of the Belluno)
  146th Alpini Company
  147th Alpini Company

All the battalions of the regiment saw heavy fighting in the Alps against Austria-Hungary's Kaiserjäger and the German Empire's Alpenkorps. Most of the time the regiment's companies were deployed alone to either capture of defend single mountain peaks or ridges.

On 22 May 1917 the regiment raised the Alpini Battalion "Monte Marmolada" with personnel from the disbanded VIII Skiers Battalion:

  Alpini Battalion "Monte Marmolada", in Cinte Tesino
  284th Alpini Company (newly raised)
  300th Alpini Company (former 5th Skiers Company of the VIII Skiers Battalion)
  301st Alpini Company (former 6th Skiers Company of the VIII Skiers Battalion)

After the Italian defeat in the Battle of Caporetto and during following retreat the 7th Alpini Regiment had to abandon its positions along the main line of the Alps and retreat towards the Piave river. The Belluno covered the retreat and was surrounded and destroyed in Cansiglio on 10 November 1917. The same fate met the Monte Marmolada, which was annihilated during the defense of Monte Castelgomberto on 4–5 December 1917. For this feat of arms the Monte Marmolada was awarded a Silver Medal of Military Valour. Because of the loss of all personnel both battalions were officially disbanded on 9 December 1917.

At the conclusion of the war the regiment had the following losses: Killed in action 141 officers and 3,602 troops; Wounded in action 205 officers and 6,578 troops. In 1919 the reserve battalions were disbanded, while on 22 March 1919 the Belluno was reformed with the personnel of the Val Cordevole battalion. The same year the Feltre was sent to Albania to help suppress the Albanian Vlora revolt. Upon its return to Italy in early 1920 the Feltre was transferred to the 9th Alpini Regiment until 1926, after which it returned to the 7th Alpini Regiment.

After the war the following military honors were awarded to the regiment and its battalions:

 7th Alpini Regiment: Croce di Cavaliere dell'O.M.I.
  Alpini Battalion "Feltre": Bronze Medal of Military Valour
  Alpini Battalion "Val Cismon": Bronze Medal of Military Valour
  Alpini Battalion "Monte Pavione": Silver Medal of Military Valour
  Alpini Battalion "Monte Marmolada": Silver Medal of Military Valour

Second Italo-Ethiopian War 
In 1935 the regiment entered the newly formed 3rd Alpine Division "Julia", but already on 12 January 1936 the regiment, together with the Feltre battalion, was sent to Eritrea to fight in the Second Italo-Ethiopian War. After arriving in East Africa the regiment entered the 5th Alpine Division "Pusteria" and received the Alpini Battalion "Pieve di Teco" from the 1st Alpini Regiment and the Alpini Battalion "Exilles" from the 3rd Alpini Regiment. Additionally the regiment received the VII (Reserve) Complements Battalion, which distinguished itself in the Second Battle of Tembien by conquering the Uork Amba mountain, for which the battalion was awarded a Bronze Medal of Military Valour. Consequently, the VII Complements Battalion was renamed Alpini Battalion "Uork Amba". When the 7th Alpini Regiment returned to Italy on 14 April 1937 the Uork Amba remained in Italian East Africa.

World War II 

At the outbreak of hostilities in September 1939 the regiment raised the Alpini battalions "Val Cismon", "Val Piave", and "Val Cordevole" from its reservists. The regiment and its six battalions were sent to the Western Alps to participate in the Italian invasion of France. After the invasion the regiment and its three traditional battalions were again assigned to the 5th Alpine Division "Pusteria", while the three reserve battalions were disbanded on 31 October 1940. In November the Pusteria was sent to Albania to fight in the Greco-Italian War. Already in January 1941 the Val Cismon was raised again and sent to Albania, where Italian forces were suffering heavy casualties, including the commanding officer of the 7th Alpini Regiment Colonel Rodolfo Psaro, who was killed on 8 December 1940.

After the German invasion of Greece concluded the war, each of the four battalions of the regiment (Feltre, Pieve di Cadore, Belluno, Val Cismon) was awarded a Silver Medal of Military Valour for separate actions. After garrison duty in the Balkans until August 1942 the 7th Alpini Regiment with its three traditional battalions was sent to France to garrison the Alpes-Maritimes region, while the Val Cismon was assigned to the 9th Alpini Regiment.

In Italian East Africa the Alpini Battalion "Uork Amba" fought in the East African Campaign and distinguished itself in the Battle of Keren earning the regiment yet another Silver Medal of Military Valour. In 1942 the Val Cismon was sent with the 3rd Alpine Division "Julia" to fight in the Soviet Union as part of the Italian Army in Russia. The Val Cismon was annihilated during the Soviet Operation Little Saturn and only a few survivors managed to avoid capture after the Battle of Nikolayevka.

After the announcement of the Armistice of Cassibile on 8 September 1943 the 7th Alpini Regiment had to surrender after brief resistance to invading German forces near the Col de Tende in France on 12 September 1943.

Cold War 
The regiment was raised again on 1 July 1953 in Belluno with the battalions Pieve di Cadore and Belluno. On 1 December of the same year the regiment together with the 6th Mountain Artillery Regiment joined the newly created Alpine Brigade "Cadore". On 1 June 1956 the Feltre was transferred from the 8th Alpini Regiment to the 7th Alpini. In 1963 the Val Cismon was reformed and placed under direct command of the brigade. The Val Cismon was tasked with manning the fortifications of the Vallo Alpino. The same year the Belluno and Pieve di Cadore were the first units to arrive in Longarone after the Vajont dam disaster. For their rescue efforts the regiment was awarded a Gold Medal of Civil Valour. During the Italian Army 1975 reform the Val Cismon was reduced to company, which was then transferred to the Alpini Battalion "Val Brenta" of the Alpine Brigade "Tridentina". On 11 November the 7th Alpini Regiment was disbanded and its battalions became independent. The flag, traditions and coat of arms of the 7th were passed to the Feltre battalion.

Before being disbanded in 1975 the structure of the 7th Alpini Regiment was as follows:

  7th Alpini Regiment, in Belluno
  Command and Services Company, in Belluno
  Alpini Battalion "Feltre", in Feltre
  64th Alpini Company
  65th Alpini Company, in Strigno
  66th Alpini Company
  125th Mortar Company
  Alpini Battalion "Pieve di Cadore", in Tai di Cadore
  67th Alpini Company
  68th Alpini Company
  75th Alpini Company
  167th Mortar Company
  Alpini Battalion "Belluno", in Belluno
  77th Alpini Company
  78th Alpini Company
  79th Alpini Company
  116th Mortar Company

After the end of the Cold War the army decided to redesignate its units as regiments for traditional reasons and on 22 August 1992 the 7th Alpini Regiment was activated again with the Feltre as its sole battalion. On the same day the flag, traditions and coat of arms were returned from the Feltre to the 7th.

Current structure

As of 2022 the 7th Alpini Regiment is part of the Alpine Brigade "Julia" and consists of:

  Regimental Command, in Belluno
  Command and Logistic Support Company "La Cacao"
  Alpini Battalion "Feltre"
  64th Alpini Company "La Crodarola"
  65th Alpini Company "La Manilla"
  66th Alpini Company "El Camors"
  125th Maneuver Support Company "La Tonante"

The Command and Logistic Support Company fields the following platoons: C3 Platoon, Transport and Materiel Platoon, Medical Platoon, and Commissariat Platoon.

Equipment 
The Alpini companies are equipped with Bv 206S tracked all-terrain carriers, Puma 6x6 wheeled armored personnel carriers and Lince light multirole vehicles. The maneuver support company is equipped with 120mm mortars and Spike MR anti-tank guided missiles.

Military honors 
The regiment and its battalions were awarded a total of two Croce di Cavaliere dell'O.M.I., one Gold Medal of Military Valour, eight Silver Medals of Military Valour, three Bronze Medals of Military Valour and one Gold Medal of Civil Valour. However, as the Alpini Battalion "Pieve di Cadore" and Alpini Battalion "Belluno" became independent battalions in 1975 and were granted their own flags the medals awarded to these units were removed from the flag and coat of arms of the 7th Alpini Regiment and transferred to the flags of the two battalions.

Sources 
 Franco dell'Uomo, Rodolfo Puletti: L'Esercito Italiano verso il 2000 - Volume Primo - Tomo I, Rome 1998, Stato Maggiore dell'Esercito - Ufficio Storico, pages: 484

External links 
 Official Homepage
 7th Alpini Regiment on vecio.it
 WWI history of the battalions of the 7th Alpini Regiment

References 

Alpini regiments of Italy
Regiments of Italy in World War I
Regiments of Italy in World War II
Military units and formations established in 1887
Military units and formations disestablished in 1943
Military units and formations established in 1953